Martha Sherrill is an American journalist, non-fiction writer, and novelist. She is the author of Dog Man: An Uncommon Life on a Faraway Mountain.

Biography 

Born in Palo Alto, California, Sherrill grew up in Glendale, California and graduated from UCLA with a degree in art history. She later moved to Washington, DC where she became a staffer at The Washington Post and a contributing editor at Esquire Magazine. One of her most notable pieces for Esquire was the 1996 article "Dream Girl", a hoax profile of a supposed up-and-coming "It Girl"/movie star named Allegra Coleman.  Sherrill later used the article as the basis for her first novel, My Last Movie Star (2003).

The Atlantic highlighted Sherrill's Esquire Classic podcast feature “My Father the Bachelor” as a "Gateway Episode".

Personal life 

Sherrill is married to author William Powers and has a son.

Selected works

Novels
 My Last Movie Star  Random House (2003)  
 The Ruins of California  Penguin Press (2006)

Non-fiction
 The Buddha from Brooklyn  Random House (2000) 
 Dog Man: An Uncommon Life on a Faraway Mountain  Penguin Press (2008)

References

External links 

Year of birth missing (living people)
Living people
21st-century American women writers
21st-century American novelists
21st-century American journalists
American women journalists
The Washington Post people
Esquire (magazine) people
University of California, Los Angeles alumni
Writers from Glendale, California
Novelists from California
Journalists from California